David John Markland (born March 1, 1978) is an American professional wrestler and promoter, better known as D. J. Hyde.

Professional wrestling
D. J. Hyde is the owner of Combat Zone Wrestling (CZW). Hyde purchased the promotion from its original owner, Zandig, in 2009. As a CZW competitor, he is a three-time CZW Iron Man Champion. In December 2012, D.J. Hyde faced "The Bulldozer" Matt Tremont in the main event of Cage of Death. Since 2013, he is also part owner of the all-woman Women Superstars Uncensored wrestling promotion. In addition, D. J. Hyde has traveled the world to compete for several independent promotions, including Big Japan Pro Wrestling and the East Coast Wrestling Association (ECWA), where he serves as the Commissioner of ECWA. Hyde has also appeared in such companies such as, Chikara, Westside Xtreme Wrestling, Jersey All Pro Wrestling, Fight Club Pro, Heartland Wrestling Association, IWA Mid South, Maryland Championship Wrestling, Championship Wrestling from Hollywood, and Dragon Gate USA, Pro Wrestling Empire, and Legacy Pro Wrestling.

Personal life
Hyde was an All-American football player at Middletown High School in Middletown, Delaware. His football skills awarded him a scholarship at Penn State University, but he later tore several ligaments in his right knee, ending up in a wheelchair for 19 months.

Championships and accomplishments

Combat Zone Wrestling
CZW Iron Man Championship (3 times)
Tournament of Death (8)
CZW Hall of Fame (Class of 2014)
East Coast Wrestling Association
Hall of Fame (2011)
Maryland Championship Wrestling
MCW Tag Team Championship (1 time) with Dino Divine
Maven Bentley Association
MBA Heavyweight Championship (1 time)
Pro Wrestling Illustrated
PWI ranked him #268 of the top 500 singles wrestlers in the PWI 500 in 2013
Rockstar Pro
Rockstar Pro Championship (1 time)

Notes

External links

 
 
 CZW roster profile
 Profightdb Profile

1978 births
21st-century professional wrestlers
American male professional wrestlers
Living people
People from Newark, Delaware
Professional wrestlers from Delaware
Professional wrestling promoters
CZW Iron Man Champions